Sir Harry Foley Vernon, 1st Baronet (11 April 1834 – 1 February 1920) was a British Liberal Party politician.

Born in 1834, Vernon was the son of Thomas Taylor and Jessie Anna Letitia (née Foley) Vernon. In 1861, he married Lady Georgina Sophia Baillie-Hamilton, daughter of George and Georgina (née Markham) Baillie-Hamilton and they had at least three children: Auda Letitia (1862–1957); Bowater George Hamilton (1865–1940); and Herbert Edward (1867–1902).

Vernon was elected Liberal MP for East Worcestershire at a by-election in 1861—caused by the death of John Hodgetts-Foley—and held the seat until 1868 when he did not seek re-election.

Vernon was created a Baronet of Hanbury Hall in 1885, in recognition of the way he managed his estate during the Great Depression of British Agriculture. Upon his death in 1920, his son, Bowater George Hamilton Vernon, succeeded to the title, after which it became extinct.

References

External links
 

UK MPs 1859–1865
UK MPs 1865–1868
Liberal Party (UK) MPs for English constituencies
1834 births
1920 deaths